Petra Conti (born 1988) is an Italian ballet dancer. She is a principal dancer with Los Angeles Ballet. Conti was previously a principal dancer with the Boston Ballet. Before moving to the United States, Conti danced as a principal with La Scala Theatre Ballet and as a corps de ballet dancer with Bavarian State Ballet.

Early life 
Petra Conti was born on April 30, 1988, in Anagni but she lived in Frosinone, Italy. Her father is Italian and her mother is Polish. Her mother and sister trained at the National Academy of Ballet in Poland.

Career 
When Conti was seventeen years old, she was invited to dance as a guest star in the Arena di Verona Ballet's Cinderella. In 2008 she was a company member of the Bavarian State Ballet and a trainee at the Marinski ballet. In 2009 she joined La Scala Theatre Ballet and was promoted to the rank of principal dancer in 2011. In 2013 Conti was invited by Mikko Nissinen to join the Boston Ballet as a principal dancer. She danced as a principal dancer with the company until 2017. Later that year she joined the Los Angeles Ballet as a resident principal guest dancer.

From 2009 until 2011 Conti studied dramatic arts with Kuniaki Ida at the Arsenale Theater in Milan.

In 2017 and 2018, Conti danced the slave variation in the Arena di Verona's production of Aida. She performed the variation in blackface and was criticized by African-American ballet dancer Sydney Magruder Washington, who took to social media to voice her objection to Conti's performance. An article criticizing her for performing in blackface was published by BroadwayWorld in 2019.

Documentary 
She was the subject of a 2010 Sky Italia documentary titled Dancers of Tomorrow which focused on her performances in Giselle, Romeo and Juliet, and Don Quixote.

Personal life 
Conti is married to Eris Nezha, former La Scala and Boston Ballet Principal Dancer and now a Principal Dancer with the Los Angeles Ballet. She is also currently earning her bachelor's degree in Science of Leadership at Northeastern University.

In 2016 Conti underwent surgery for kidney cancer.

References 

Living people
1988 births
21st-century ballet dancers
Italian ballerinas
Italian people of Polish descent
Boston Ballet principal dancers
La Scala Theatre Ballet dancers
Mariinsky Ballet dancers
Northeastern University alumni
People from Frosinone
Naturalized citizens of the United States